Qandula  is a town in the District of Jabal al Akhdar in north-eastern Libya. It is located 25 km south of Bayda .

References

Populated places in Jabal al Akhdar